The Transport Accident Investigation Commission (TAIC) is a transport safety body of New Zealand. It has its headquarters on the 7th floor of 10 Brandon Street in Wellington. The agency investigates aviation, marine, and rail accidents and incidents occurring in New Zealand. It does not investigate road accidents except where they affect the safety of aviation, marine, or rail (e.g. level crossing or car ferry accidents).

It was established by Act of the Parliament of New Zealand (the Transport Accident Investigation Commission Act 1990) on 1 September 1990. TAIC's legislation, functions and powers were modelled on and share some similarities with the National Transportation Safety Board (USA) and the Transportation Safety Board (Canada). It is a standing Commission of Inquiry and an independent Crown entity, and reports to the Minister of Transport.

Initially investigating aviation accidents only, the TAIC's jurisdiction was extended in 1992 to cover railway accidents and later in 1995 to cover marine accidents.

In May 2006, the Aviation Industry Association claimed too often the organisation did not find the true cause of accidents, after TAIC released the results of a second investigation into a fatal helicopter crash at Taumarunui in 2001. The Commission rejected the criticism, CEO Lois Hutchinson citing the results of a March 2003 audit by the International Civil Aviation Organization.

Ron Chippindale, who investigated the Mount Erebus Disaster, was Chief Inspector of Accidents from 1990 to 31 October 1998. He was succeeded by Capt. Tim Burfoot, John Mockett in 2002, Tim Burfoot again in 2007, Aaron Holman in 2019, Harald Hendel in 2020, and Naveen Kozhuppakalam in 2022.

Peer agencies in other countries
Australian Transport Safety Bureau
Aviation and Railway Accident Investigation Board – South Korea
Dutch Safety Board – Netherlands
Taiwan Transportation Safety Board – Taiwan
Japan Transport Safety Board
National Transportation Safety Board – United States
National Transportation Safety Committee – Indonesia
Safety Investigation Authority – Finland
Swedish Accident Investigation Authority – Sweden
Swiss Transportation Safety Investigation Board – Switzerland
Transportation Safety Board of Canada
Transport Safety Investigation Bureau – Singapore

References

External links
 

New Zealand
Rail accident investigators
New Zealand independent crown entities
1990 establishments in New Zealand
Transport organisations based in New Zealand